Chirodiscoides is a genus of mites belonging to the family Atopomelidae.

The species of this genus are found in Europe and America.

Species:

Chirodiscoides caviae 
Chirodiscoides proechimys

References

Acari